The Red Sea Clownfish (Amphiprion bicinctus, meaning "both sawlike with two stripes"), commonly known as the Red Sea or two-banded anemonefish is a  marine fish belonging to the family Pomacentridae, the clownfishes and damselfishes. Like other species of the genus, the fish feeds on algae and zooplankton in the wild.

Characteristics of Anemonefish  

Clownfish or anemonefish are  fishes  that, in the wild, form symbiotic mutualisms with sea anemones and are unaffected by the stinging tentacles of the host anemone, see .  The sea anemone protects the clownfish from predators, as well as providing food through the scraps left from the anemone's meals and occasional dead anemone tentacles. In return, the clownfish defends the anemone from its predators, and parasites. Clownfish are small-sized, and depending on species, they are overall yellow, orange, or a reddish or blackish color, and many show white bars or patches. Within species there may be color variations, most commonly according to distribution, but also based on sex, age and host anemone.  Clownfish are found in warmer waters of the Indian and Pacific oceans and the Red Sea in sheltered reefs or in shallow lagoons.

In a group of clownfish, there is a strict dominance hierarchy. The largest and most aggressive fish is female and is found at the top. Only two clownfish, a male and a female, in a group reproduce through external fertilization. Clownfish are sequential hermaphrodites, meaning that they develop into males first, and when they mature, they become females.

Description
The fish's body is yellow-orange to dark brown. As the name suggests, the two-banded anemonefish has two white bands or bars, with black edges. The head-bar considerably wider. They have 9-10 dorsal spines, 2 anal spines, 15-17 dorsal soft rays and 13-14 anal soft rays.

Color variation
The principal variation is that the body can be yellow-orange to dark brown.

Similar species
A pattern of two white bars is common to species within the clarkii complex sub genus. The yellow caudal fin of A. bicinctus distinguishes it from all but A. latifasciatus and some variations of A. clarkii, however A. clarkii has a white base with a sharp demarcation between light and dark.  A. latifasciatus has a much wider mid-body bar and forked caudal fin. The caudal fin on A. allardi and A. chagosensis is white or whitish.

Distribution and Habitat
The species is found in the Western Indian Ocean, the Red Sea, Socotra and the Chagos archipelago.

Host anemones
The relationship between anemonefish and their host sea anemones is not random, instead being highly nested in structure.  A. bicinctus is generalist, being hosted by the following 5 species of anemones: 
Entacmaea quadricolor Bubble-tip anemone
Heteractis aurora white beaded anemone
Heteractis crispa Sebae anemone
Heteractis magnifica magnificent sea anemone
Stichodactyla gigantea giant carpet anemone

Studies conducted in the northern Red Sea have demonstrated that A. bicinctus has a preference for E. quadricolor over H. crispa and sexually mature fish are rarely hosted by H. crispa. In 2005, anemone density was found to affect whether H. crispa hosted anemonefish, with clusters of juvenile fish only found at low density sites, while either 1 or no juvenile anemonefish were found in H. crispa at the high density site. The authors theorised that H. crispa was a nursery anemone due to  being unable to adequately protect adult anemonefish from predation, active emigration of fish to E. quadricolor and/or environmentally-controlled cessation of fish growth.  A subsequent study in 2012 tested the nursery theory and concluded that the sea anemone H. crispa was a less-preferred host than E. quadricolor, and that fish preference appeared to be the result of body size, morphology, and behavior of the host.

Images

References

External links

 
 
 

Amphiprion
Fish of the Red Sea
Fish described in 1830